"Sentimento" is a pop ballad written for Italian singer Valerio Scanu's debut album, Sentimento. The song is the album's lead single (Scanu's official first single), released in Italy and others European countries.
The single has reached number one in Italy.

Track listing
Digital download/EP

"Sentimento" – 4:11

Charts

Year-end charts

References

External links
 Official website

2009 singles
Italian-language songs
Number-one singles in Italy
Pop ballads

it:Valerio Scanu#Discografia